Lee Seung-joon (born April 23, 1978) is a South Korean actor. Lee was among the non-mainstream, little-known actors who appeared in Project 577, a 2012 documentary about a cross-country trek from Seoul to Haenam. In 2014, he played his first starring role in a feature film in the indie Go, Stop, Murder, a fantasy thriller about Go-Stop gambling.

Filmography

Film

Television

References

External links
 
 

1978 births
Living people
20th-century South Korean male actors
21st-century South Korean male actors
South Korean male film actors
South Korean male television actors